Judo at the 2001 Southeast Asian Games was held in Penang International Sports Arena, Penang, Malaysia from 13 to 16 September 2001

Medalist

Men's events

Women's events

Medal table
Legend

References

External links
 

2001 Southeast Asian Games events
2001
Asian Games, Southeast